The 1827 Rhode Island gubernatorial election was an uncontested election held on April 18, 1827 to elect the Governor of Rhode Island. James Fenner, the incumbent governor and Jackson Republican nominee, was the only candidate and so won with 100% of the vote. Jackson Republicans were a faction of the Democratic-Republican Party which favoured Andrew Jackson over John Quincy Adams for president.

General election

Candidates
James Fenner, Governor since 1824.

Results

References

Rhode Island gubernatorial elections
1827 Rhode Island elections
Rhode Island
April 1827 events